The Neuroblastoma Children's Cancer Alliance UK, commonly referred to as NCCA UK, is a UK charity that helps children and families affected by neuroblastoma, a type of childhood cancer. The charity helps families by helping them to access and fundraise for their child's treatment abroad when no treatment is available in the UK, offering support and funding research into the condition.

History

The charity was set up in April 2006 as the 2Simple Trust. The charity initially had broad aims, but the trustees decided to focus on helping children with neuroblastoma after learning about the potential to save children's lives from a parent, Yvonne Brown, whose son Jack was diagnosed with the disease.

Despite receiving pioneering treatment abroad that his parents had fundraised for, Jack Brown died in 2009. The charity has continued its work with families affected by neuroblastoma and by January 2013 had funded treatment for 21 children abroad.

In 2011, the charity rebranded as the Neuroblastoma Children's Cancer Alliance UK, which is abbreviated to NCCA UK.

Neuroblastoma Alliance UK's work

Financial assistance for treatment

The Neuroblastoma Alliance UK helps families access and fundraise for their child's treatment abroad. Various new treatments for neuroblastoma are being trialled in the UK, but if children do not meet the criteria for a trial, or need treatment that is only available abroad, families have to pay for their child's treatment abroad.

The costs of treatment abroad vary from around £80,000 for treatment in Germany to more than £300,000 for treatment in the United States.

The charity has a number of appeals for children that are fundraising to receive treatment abroad. Some of the families supported by the charity have attracted high-profile media and celebrity support for their fundraising campaigns.

Support for families

The charity helps families affected by neuroblastoma by putting them in touch with other families that have gone through a similar situation. It also holds events for parents so they can meet other families and learn more about advances in research and treatment.

Research

The NCCA UK has funded research, including a project at University College Hospital, London, which aims to improve radiation treatments for patients with neuroblastoma.

See also
 The Neuroblastoma Society
 Help Fight Childhood Cancer
 Band of Parents
 Young Lives vs Cancer
 Children With Leukaemia
 Leukaemia & Lymphoma Research

General:
 Cancer in the United Kingdom

References

External links
 Neuroblastoma Children's Cancer Alliance UK
 NB Alliance's Facebook page

Health charities in the United Kingdom
Charities based in London
Children's charities based in the United Kingdom
Cancer organisations based in the United Kingdom
2006 establishments in the United Kingdom
Organisations based in the London Borough of Camden
Organizations established in 2006